Pinkerton is a private security guard and detective agency established  around 1850 in the United States by Scottish-born American cooper Allan Pinkerton and Chicago attorney Edward Rucker as the North-Western Police Agency, which later became Pinkerton & Co, and finally the Pinkerton National Detective Agency. It is currently a subsidiary of Swedish-based Securitas AB. Pinkerton became famous when he claimed to have foiled the Baltimore Plot to assassinate president-elect Abraham Lincoln in 1861. Lincoln later hired Pinkerton agents to conduct espionage against the Confederacy and act as his personal security during the American Civil War.

The Pinkerton National Detective Agency hired women and minorities from its founding, a practice uncommon at the time, as they were useful as spies. At the height of their power, the Pinkerton Detective Agency was the largest private law enforcement organization in the world.

Following the Civil War, the Pinkertons began conducting operations against organized labor. During the labor strikes of the late 19th and early 20th centuries, businesses hired the Pinkerton Agency to infiltrate unions, supply guards, keep strikers and suspected unionists out of factories, and recruit goon squads to intimidate workers. During the Homestead Strike of 1892, Pinkerton agents were called in to reinforce the strikebreaking measures of industrialist Henry Clay Frick, who was acting on behalf of Andrew Carnegie, the head of Carnegie Steel. Tensions between the workers and strikebreakers erupted into violence which led to the deaths of three Pinkerton agents and nine steelworkers. During the late nineteenth century, the Pinkertons were also hired as guards in coal, iron, and lumber disputes in Illinois, Michigan, New York, Pennsylvania, and West Virginia. Pinkertons were also involved in other strikes such as the Great Railroad Strike of 1877 and the Battle of Blair Mountain in 1921.

During the 20th century, Pinkerton rebranded itself into a personal security and risk management firm. The company has continued to exist in various forms through to the present day, and is now a division of the Swedish security company Securitas AB, operating as "Pinkerton Consulting & Investigations, Inc. d.b.a. Pinkerton Corporate Risk Management". The former Government Services division, PGS, now operates as "Securitas Critical Infrastructure Services, Inc.".

Origins

In the 1850s, Allan Pinkerton, a Scottish immigrant, met Chicago attorney Edward Rucker in a local Masonic Hall. The two men formed the North-Western Police Agency, later known as the Pinkerton Agency. Pinkerton used his skills in espionage to attract clients and begin growing the agency.

Historian Frank Morn writes: "By the mid-1850s a few businessmen saw the need for greater control over their employees; their solution was to sponsor a private detective system. In February 1855, Allan Pinkerton, after consulting with six midwestern railroads, created such an agency in Chicago."

Among the business's early operations was to safely deliver the newly elected President of the United States Abraham Lincoln to Washington, D.C., in light of an assassination threat. Pinkerton detective Kate Warne was assigned and successfully delivered Lincoln to the U.S. capital city through a series of disguises and related tactics that required her to stay awake throughout the entire long journey. As a result of the public notoriety of this success, the business adapted an open eye as its logo and the slogan, "We never sleep."

US government contractor
In 1871, Congress appropriated $50,000 (about ) to the new Department of Justice to form a sub-organization devoted to "the detection and prosecution of those guilty of violating federal law." The amount was insufficient to fashion an internal investigating unit, so they contracted out the services to the Pinkerton National Detective Agency.

However, as news leaked about the Pinkerton's involvement in strikebreaking became public knowledge, lawmakers began pushing against the government contracts with the Pinkertons. The Pinkertons reached their zenith in the 1870s and 80s which saw them frequently engage in violent crackdowns against striking workers. The most notable example of this was the involvement of the Pinkertons in the Great Railroad Strike of 1877. However, it was the confrontation in Homestead, Pennsylvania, in 1892 that led to a national outcry against the Pinkerton Detective Agency. Following the strike, Congress took swift action against the Pinkertons and passed the Anti-Pinkerton Act in 1893, which severely curtailed the relationship between the federal government and the agency.  The act states that, "individual employed by the Pinkerton Detective Agency, or similar organization, may not be employed by the Government of the United States or the government of the District of Columbia."

Chicago "Special Officers" and watchmen
July 27, 1877: J. J. White, who had been hired as a "Special Officer" during a strike, was shot and killed.
July 19, 1919: Hans Rassmuson, Special Officer, was shot and killed.
March 12, 1924: Frank Miller, Pinkerton Watchman, was shot and killed.

Molly Maguires

In the 1870s, Franklin B. Gowen, then president of the Philadelphia and Reading Railroad, hired the agency to "investigate" the labor unions in the company's mines.  A Pinkerton agent, James McParland, using the alias "James McKenna", infiltrated the Molly Maguires, a 19th-century secret society of mainly Irish-American coal miners, leading to the downfall of the labor organization.

The incident inspired Arthur Conan Doyle's Sherlock Holmes novel The Valley of Fear (1914–1915). A Pinkerton agent also appears in a small role in "The Adventure of the Red Circle", a 1911 Holmes story. A 1970 film, The Molly Maguires, was loosely based upon the incident as well.

Homestead strike

On July 6, 1892, during the Homestead Strike, 300 Pinkerton agents from New York and Chicago were called in by Carnegie Steel's Henry Clay Frick to protect the Pittsburgh-area mill and strikebreakers. This resulted in a firefight and siege in which 16 men were killed, and 23 others were wounded. Following the confrontation, the Governor of Pennsylvania, Robert E. Pattinson, mobilized state law enforcement and the National Guard. Private and government forces broke the strike and workers returned to the steel mill.

The strike, dubbed "The Battle of Homestead" by local media ignited a firestorm around the United States. Americans were outraged at the conduct of the Pinkertons and how strikers were treated. The Homestead Strike of 1892 is regarded as a turning point in American labor history and prompted Congress to begin a crackdown on the Pinkertons.

As a legacy of the Pinkertons' involvement, a bridge connecting the nearby Pittsburgh suburbs of Munhall and Rankin was named Pinkerton's Landing Bridge.

Steunenberg murder and trial

Harry Orchard was arrested by the Idaho police and confessed to Pinkerton agent James McParland that he assassinated former Governor Frank Steunenberg of Idaho in 1905. Orchard testified (unsuccessfully), under threat of hanging, against Western Federation of Miners president Big Bill Haywood, naming him as having hired the hit. With a stirring defense by Clarence Darrow, Haywood and the other defendants of the WFM were acquitted in a nationally publicized trial. Orchard received a death sentence, but it was commuted.

Outlaws and competition
Pinkerton agents were hired to track western outlaws Jesse James, the Reno Gang, and the Wild Bunch (including Butch Cassidy and the Sundance Kid). On March 17, 1874, two Pinkerton Detectives and a deputy sheriff, Edwin P. Daniels, encountered the Younger brothers (associates of the James–Younger Gang); Daniels, John Younger, and one Pinkerton agent were killed. In Union, Missouri, a bank was robbed by George Collins, aka Fred Lewis, and Bill Randolph; Pinkerton Detective Chas Schumacher trailed them and was killed. Collins was hanged on March 26, 1904, and Randolph was hanged on May 8, 1905, in Union. Pinkertons were also hired for transporting money and other high-quality merchandise between cities and towns, which made them vulnerable to outlaws. Pinkerton agents were usually well paid and well armed.

George Thiel, a former Pinkerton employee, established the Thiel Detective Service Company in St. Louis, Missouri, a competitor to the Pinkerton agency. Thiel's agency operated in the U.S., Canada, and Mexico.

Modern era
Due to its conflicts with labor unions, the word Pinkerton continues to be associated by labor organizers and union members with strikebreaking. Pinkertons diversified from labor spying following revelations publicized by the La Follette Committee hearings in 1937, and the firm's criminal detection work also suffered from the police modernization movement, which saw the rise of the Federal Bureau of Investigation and the bolstering of detective branches and resources of the public police. With less of the labor and criminal investigation work on which Pinkertons thrived for decades, the company became increasingly involved in protection services, and in the 1960s, even the word "detective" disappeared from the agency's letterhead. The company now focuses on threat intelligence, risk management, executive protection, and active shooter response.

In 1999, the company was bought by Securitas AB, a Swedish security company, for $384 million, followed by the acquisition of the William J. Burns Detective Agency (founded in 1910), longtime Pinkerton rival, to create (as a division of the parent) Securitas Security Services USA. Today, the company's headquarters are located in Ann Arbor, Michigan.

In 2020 they were hired by Amazon to spy on warehouse workers for signs of union activity. It was revealed in 2022 that Starbucks had hired a former Pinkerton employee as part of their union busting efforts.

In 2020, Michael Dolloff, an unlicensed security guard contracted through Pinkerton, shot and killed Lee Keltner, a conservative protestor in Denver, Colorado. Dolloff had been contracted by Pinkerton to guard a camera-crew working for 9News. They had been assigned to cover clashes between liberal and conservative protestors in Denver. Keltner, a veteran of the U.S. Navy, had told a camera-man to stop filming him; Dolloff then approached Keltner. Keltner hit Dolloff, before spraying him with bear-spray. Dolloff then shot Keltner. Dolloff was arrested, and charged with murder. The charges were later dropped.

In popular culture

Books
 In the Sherlock Holmes novel The Valley of Fear, Birdy Edwards is a Pinkerton agent. Another Pinkerton agent, Leverton, makes his appearance in the short story "The Adventure of the Red Circle".
 Dashiell Hammett's Continental Op detective stories were based on his experiences working for the Pinkerton agency for several periods during 1917–22. The Baltimore branch, where Hammett first worked, was housed in the Continental Trust Building; the Pinkerton agency was not named. Hammett also worked in the San Francisco office, thus many of the Op stories were set in that city. They were published in Black Mask magazine from 1923 to 1930. There have been several Continental Op book collections. Four of the stories were combined to form Hammett's first novel Red Harvest.
 Many Louis L'Amour books contain references to the Pinkertons, including Milo Talon.
 In the James Bond novels, Felix Leiter becomes a Pinkerton detective between Live and Let Die and Diamonds Are Forever.
 Former Pinkerton agent Charlie Siringo published an exposé on methods used by the Pinkertons during the 1880s and 1890s in his 1914 book Two Evil-Isms: Pinkertonism and Anarchism. The agency soon suppressed publication of the book and made a request to the Governor of New Mexico, William C. McDonald, to arrest Siringo for criminal libel and extradite him to Chicago. Governor McDonald denied their request, but the agency was successful in obtaining a court order to impound all existing copies of the book.

Film
 In the 1970 film The Molly Maguires Richard Harris portrays Pinkerton Detective James McParland whose undercover work leads to the execution of "Black Jack" Kehoe, played by Sean Connery, who had befriended him.
Allan Pinkerton and several agents play a vital role in the film American Outlaws (2001), starring Colin Farrell and Gabriel Macht as Jesse and Frank James. Pinkerton and his detectives are hired by the owner of the fictional Rock Northern Rail Road to track down Jesse James and his gang following a series of robberies aimed at his company.
The Pinkertons have been featured in the 1980 movie The Long Riders, where Pinkerton agents are depicted investigating the criminal activities of the James brothers.
Pinkerton detectives are featured in the 3:10 to Yuma remake featuring Russell Crowe and Christian Bale, appearing at the start of the film defending a stagecoach from bandits.
In the 1994 western film Bad Girls the three main characters are being tracked down by two Pinkerton agents after committing murder.
In the 2005 film Legend of Zorro, a pair of Pinkerton agents sees Zorro's face and recognise him. The following day, the Pinkertons confront his wife, Elena, and blackmail her into divorcing him in order to get close to the main antagonist Count Armand, and learn of his plans without the aid of Zorro, as they dislike Zorro and his vigilante ways. As the film is set in 1850, the presence of "Pinkertons" is an anachronism.
In the 2017 Kenneth Branagh film Murder on the Orient Express, Cyrus Bethman Hardman is revealed to be an undercover Pinkerton detective.
In the 2019 film Badland, Kevin Makely plays the main character and protagonist, Mathias Breecher, a detective of the Pinkerton Detective Agency.

Television
In the television series Damnation, Creeley Turner, one of the two lead characters, is a Pinkerton agent sent to Iowa by a powerful industrialist to stop a farmer strike.
The Pinkertons, a scripted one-hour syndicated starring Angus Macfadyen as Allan Pinkerton, debuted in 2014.
Cole Hauser plays Charlie Siringo, a Pinkerton investigating Lizzie Borden, in the 2015 mini-series The Lizzie Borden Chronicles.
In the Canadian-American television drama When Calls the Heart, Pinkerton security officers are employed by the mining company managed by Henry Gowen (Martin Cummins)
Allan Pinkerton was portrayed by Charlie Day in the second-series episode of Drunk History entitled "Baltimore". The episode relays the story of Allan Pinkerton successfully protecting Abraham Lincoln, portrayed by Martin Starr, from assassination.
"Bloody Battles", the second episode of the 2012 miniseries The Men Who Built America, focuses on the relationship between Andrew Carnegie and Henry Clay Frick, which is damaged by the 1892 Homestead strike when Frick hires the Pinkertons.
 In the television series Deadwood, the Pinkertons are prominently featured as mercenaries paid for by George Hearst, the final season's antagonist.
In the television series 1883, Shea Brennan (played by Sam Elliott) and Thomas (played by LaMonica Garrett) are Pinkerton Agents.

Video games
The protagonist of the video game BioShock Infinite, Booker DeWitt, is an ex-Pinkerton and former member of the "goon squads" used by the agency to suppress strikes. One of the game's trophies, awarded for completing the highest difficulty, is titled "Stone Cold Pinkerton".
In the online game Poptropica, Pinkerton's services are used to catch a thief on Mystery Train Island. They are also revealed to be protecting President Grover Cleveland.
Pinkerton detectives appear as antagonists in Red Dead Redemption 2 and Red Dead Redemption. In Red Dead Redemption 2 they are led by Andrew Milton and Edgar Ross and act primarily as mercenaries and investigators employed to track down the Van der Linde gang. Take-Two Interactive, parent company of game publisher Rockstar Games, received a cease and desist notice from Securitas AB, asserting that Red Dead Redemption 2s use of the Pinkerton name and badge imagery was against their trademark of both their name and likeness. Securitas AB further demanded royalties for each copy of the game sold or that they would take legal action. Take-Two filed a complaint against Securitas in January 2019, asserting that the Pinkerton name was strongly associated with the Wild West, and its use of the term did not infringe on the Pinkerton trademark. Take-Two sought a summary judgment to declare the use of Pinkerton in the game as allowed fair use. By April 2019, Securitas withdrew its claims and Take-Two moved to withdraw its complaint and the Pinkerton name remains displayed in the game.

See also
Anti-union organizations in the United States
Anti-union violence
Baldwin–Felts Detective Agency
Battle of Blair Mountain
Coal and Iron Police, a Pinkerton-supervised former private police force in Pennsylvania
Colorado Labor Wars
George Samuel Dougherty, a leading private detective for the Pinkerton National Detective Agency from 1888 to 1911
Morris Friedman, author of Pinkerton Labor Spy
Dashiell Hammett, author and former Pinkerton operative
Industrial Workers of the World
Labor spying in the United States
Frank Little, American labor leader; lynched in 1917, allegedly by Pinkerton agents
List of worker deaths in United States labor disputes
Timothy Webster

References
Notes

Further reading
 
  
 Obert, Jonathan (2018) "Pinkertons and Police in Antebellum Chicago" in The Six-Shooter State: Public and Private Violence in American Politics. Cambridge, England: Cambridge University Press.
 O'Hara, S. Paul (2016) Inventing the Pinkertons; or, Spies, Sleuths, Mercenaries, and Thugs Baltimore, Maryland: Johns Hopkins University Press.

External links

 
 Radio Programme with Ward Churchill

 
1850 establishments in Illinois
Companies based in Chicago
Companies based in Ann Arbor, Michigan
American companies established in 1850
Private detectives and investigators
Private intelligence agencies
Labor-related violence in the United States
1999 mergers and acquisitions
American subsidiaries of foreign companies